Edwin P. Compass, III is a former Chief of Police of the New Orleans Police Department.

He resigned as Chief of Police on September 27, 2005. Compass, who earlier said he was organizing a tribunal to handle the cases of 249 officers who left their posts without permission during Hurricane Katrina, did not give any reason for his resignation. Compass's resignation followed a few days after an emergency injunction was handed down, prohibiting him “from confiscating lawfully-possessed firearms from citizens ... “ His actions subsequently led to the passage of the Disaster Recovery Personal Protection Act.

Compass has declared that he was actually forced to resign his post.

Eddie Compass was the youngest major city police chief in the country.

References
  
  
  
  

Living people
Year of birth missing (living people)
African-American police officers
21st-century African-American people
Chiefs of the New Orleans Police Department